Middlewich First is a minor English political party based in the town of Middlewich, Cheshire. It currently holds 0 seats on the unitary Cheshire East Council. After losing 3 seats in the 2019 local elections as well as losing all 7 seats they held on Middlewich Town council.

The party was registered in 2003, and won a majority on Middlewich Town Council in May 2003 by standing 8 unopposed candidates. All three borough seats in Middlewich were won in 2008. Mike Parsons said of their success that "I think it is certainly fair to say this result reflects the Middlewich public's genuine dislike of all politicians. They are sick of party politics and squabbling."

References

External links 
Middlewich Council
Cheshire East Council

Middlewich
Locally based political parties in England
Politics of Cheshire
Political parties established in 2003
2003 establishments in England